Kátia Cilene Teixeira da Silva (born 18 February 1977), known simply as Kátia, is a Brazilian former footballer.

Career
A former track and field star who finished as high as fifth in the heptathlon at the South American championships, Katia is a veteran of three World Cups and two Olympic games. She began her international career as a key member of the Brazilian team in the 1995 Women's World Cup in Sweden, then played all five of her country's matches in the Atlanta Olympics. Her outstanding play and two goals at the 1999 Women's World Cup drew rave reviews and in 2000 she finished fourth in scoring at the Sydney Olympics.

Katia spent five seasons in the Brazilian Women's League and ranked as the No.1 goal scorer in each of them. In 1997 she scored 34 goals as the newly formed São Paulo FC won the Campeonato Paulista de Futebol Feminino. With the launch of the WUSA in 2001, Katia was given the opportunity to take her game to an even higher level and she signed with the San Jose CyberRays. That first season she played well and scored seven goals. In 2002, she improved to score 15 goals. Her goals plus her five assists also made her the leading overall point scorer with 35.

Spain
In February 2005, Kátia arrived in Spain to play for Estudiantes Huelva. She transferred to Levante UD in May 2005 to play in the post-season 2005 Copa de la Reina de Fútbol, scoring two goals in five games to help her new club retain the trophy. She then agreed a deal to remain with Levante for the 2005–06 Superliga Femenina season.

France
Katia moved to France's Olympique Lyonnais Féminin in January 2007, scoring 57 goals in 58 league matches. In summer 2010 she signed for Paris Saint-Germain Féminines.

Later career
After spending five years in the Division 1 Féminine in 2011 she moved to the Russian Championship where she played for Zorky Krasnogorsk. She played for Sundsvalls DFF in 2013.

International career
Kátia was frequently part of the Brazil women's national football team from 1995 to 2007. She went to three World Cups, finishing in second place in 2007 and third in 1999, as well as being in the quarter-finalist's squad from 2003. While she played in the 2000 Summer Olympics, finishing fourth, Kátia was left out of the team that won an Olympic silver in 2004 due to a knee injury. Kátia retired from the national team after the 2007 Pan American Games in her hometown of Rio de Janeiro, where Brazil won the gold.

References

External links
Olympique Lyonnais profile 
Profile at AupaAthletic 
 (I)
 (II)

1977 births
Living people
Brazilian women's footballers
Women's association football forwards
Olympic footballers of Brazil
Footballers at the 1996 Summer Olympics
Footballers at the 2000 Summer Olympics
Footballers at the 2007 Pan American Games
1995 FIFA Women's World Cup players
1999 FIFA Women's World Cup players
2003 FIFA Women's World Cup players
2007 FIFA Women's World Cup players
Footballers from Rio de Janeiro (city)
Brazilian expatriate women's footballers
Expatriate women's soccer players in the United States
Olympique Lyonnais Féminin players
Expatriate women's footballers in France
Expatriate women's footballers in Spain
Primera División (women) players
Levante UD Femenino players
Paris Saint-Germain Féminine players
Brazil women's international footballers
San Jose CyberRays players
Expatriate women's footballers in Russia
FC Zorky Krasnogorsk (women) players
Expatriate women's footballers in Sweden
Brazilian expatriate sportspeople in the United States
Brazilian expatriate sportspeople in France
Brazilian expatriate sportspeople in Spain
Brazilian expatriate sportspeople in Russia
Brazilian expatriate sportspeople in Sweden
Pan American Games gold medalists for Brazil
Pan American Games medalists in football
Division 1 Féminine players
Saad Esporte Clube (women) players
Medalists at the 2007 Pan American Games
São Paulo FC (women) players
Sundsvalls DFF players
Elitettan players
Women's United Soccer Association players